Anne Coleman is an Australian former professional tennis player.

Coleman, a Western Australian junior champion, was ranked amongst the top 10 juniors in the country. She qualified for the singles main draw of the 1971 Wimbledon Championships and was a women's doubles quarter-finalist at the 1972 Australian Open (with Christine Matison). She is of no relation to her contemporary Patricia Coleman.

References

External links
 
 

Year of birth missing (living people)
Living people
Australian female tennis players
Tennis people from Western Australia